Arne Johansson can refer to:

 Arne Johansson (cyclist) (1927-2018), Swedish cyclist
 Arne Johansson (ice hockey) (1915-1956), Swedish ice hockey player
 Arne Johansson (orienteer), Swedish orienteer